Žan Tabak (born 15 June 1970) is a Croatian professional basketball coach and former player who is now serving as the head coach for Trefl Sopot of the PLK. His basketball career, spanning twenty years, was marked by several notable achievements, despite injuries. He was the first international player to play in the NBA Finals for two teams. Žan Tabak averaged 5.0 points in his 6-year NBA career.

Early career
Born in Split, SR Croatia, SFR Yugoslavia, Tabak's father-in-law Ratomir Tvrdić was a top European basketball player, his wife played first-division basketball for Croatia, and his younger brother played professionally in Croatia.

Tabak began his basketball career in 1985, at the age of fifteen, making his debut with the Jugoplastika Split organization.  Only a few years later, he and Split teammates Dino Rađa and Toni Kukoč led the club to three consecutive European Championships (1989–91), a feat only equaled in EuroLeague's storied history by its first champions, Rīgas ASK, some thirty years before.

Rađa and Kukoč were 2nd-round selections in the 1989 and 1990 National Basketball Association (NBA) Drafts, respectively.

Professional career

Houston Rockets (1991–1995) 
Tabak was selected by the Houston Rockets with the 24th pick in the second round (51st overall) of the 1991 NBA Draft. He did not immediately play for Houston, however, opting instead to spend another year in Croatia with SD Split.

Return to Europe (1991–1994) 
On June 25, 1991, Croatia, along with Slovenia, decided to end relationships with the other republics of the Yugoslavia. The newly independent state, then, was able to send its own athletes to the 1992 Summer Olympic Games; this delegation also included a national basketball team.

Along with previous Split teammates and Dražen Petrović, Tabak and the Croatian team performed well and won the silver medal; they were bested only by the star-studded United States Dream Team.

After Barcelona, Tabak continued with his career, spending two years in the Italian Serie A league. In his years there, Tabak shot the ball extremely well, with a field goal percentage of over 60%.  He also averaged a double-double in points and rebounds in both the 1992–93 season for Baker Livorno and in the 1993–94 season for Recoaro Milano.

Return to NBA (1994–1998) 
Over three years after he was drafted by them, Tabak was signed by the Rockets on July 20, 1994. With nine years of experience, he played his first NBA minutes on November 5, 1994.  As a rookie, he saw limited playing time, averaging less than five minutes per game in thirty-seven appearances.  He spent the season as a backup to Hakeem Olajuwon, who led Houston to the franchise's second NBA title that year as Tabak won his first and only NBA championship.

Toronto Raptors (1995–1998) 
In the 1995 expansion draft, Tabak was selected by the Toronto Raptors.

On February 25, 1996 Tabak recorded a career high 16 rebounds in a 98–105 loss to the Dallas Mavericks.

On March 27, 1996 Tabak dropped a career high 26 points in a 94–103 loss to the Philadelphia 76ers.

He started several games and saw increased playing time, but a strained left groin kept him from competing during the close of the 1995–96 season. As for the Raptors, the franchise had an expectably bad season ending with a sub-par 21–61 record and missing the playoffs. Tabak did not fare well in the following season, either; plantar fasciitis in his left foot restricted his appearances to thirteen games.

After another average start and a transverse fracture to a metacarpal bone in his right hand, Tabak was traded in a seven-player deal to the Boston Celtics in February 1998.

Tabak played in Turkey for Fenerbahçe during the next year.  He then returned to the NBA and signed with the Indiana Pacers.  As back-up to Rik Smits, Tabak contributed to the Pacers' appearance in the 2000 NBA Finals, which was ultimately won by the Los Angeles Lakers.

The 2000–01 season was to be Tabak's last in the NBA, despite improved numbers and increased playing time.  When asked about his decision to return to European basketball Tabak said "...I wanted to come back [to Europe] because I felt I was 31 years old and I was feeling my career was coming to the end. I didn't want to finish my career being just one of the players. I wanted to be an important player in my team."

Post-NBA career
Tabak spent the remaining four years of his playing career in Spain with Real Madrid, DKV Joventut, and Unicaja Málaga.He maintained a high caliber of play during his later career.  Even as he won with Split and the Rockets in his earlier days, he ended twenty years of professional basketball also as a winner: along with Jorge Garbajosa, Tabak helped Málaga to win the 2005 King's Cup, the Spanish national cup trophy.

In 2006, he worked for the New York Knicks as an international scout.

In 2011, he debuted as head coach with Sant Josep Girona of the LEB Oro league. In 2012, he moved to Poland where he became the head coach of the 2011–12 Polish league runner-up Trefl Sopot. In November 2012, he became head coach of Saski Baskonia. With the Spanish squad, he achieved a 17-game winning streak for games played in both the EuroLeague and the Liga ACB. After being eliminated in the 2012–13 season quarterfinals, Baskonia announced that Tabak would not continue as head coach.

Tabak was the head coach of the  Slovakia national basketball team from 2019 until 2021. He led them to the second round of pre-qualification for the 2023 World Cup and then led the position for personal reasons. At the same time he was the head coach of the Polish Stelmet Zielona Gora.

On June 30, 2021, Tabak signed with San Pablo Burgos of the Liga ACB. In November, 2021, after a series of bad results, he left the club.

On May 9, 2022, he has signed with Trefl Sopot of the PLK.

Personal
In the mid-1990s, Tabak married Gorana Tvrdić, daughter of retired professional basketball player Rato Tvrdić, having met her several years earlier while playing for KK Split. The couple has three children and has been residing in Madrid since 2001.

In March 2020, Tabak's wife Gorana contracted COVID-19 in Madrid and within weeks developed severe symptoms for which she was intubated and placed in a 16-day induced coma. By late April 2020, her condition improved and she got released for home rehabilitation.

References and notes

External links
 Žan Tabak at euroleague.net
 Žan Tabak at euroleague.net (coach)

1970 births
Living people
Baloncesto Fuenlabrada coaches
Baloncesto Málaga players
Basketball players at the 1992 Summer Olympics
Basketball players at the 1996 Summer Olympics
Basketball players from Split, Croatia
Boston Celtics players
Centers (basketball)
Croatian basketball coaches
Croatian expatriate basketball people in Canada
Croatian expatriate basketball people in Italy
Croatian expatriate basketball people in Spain
Croatian expatriate basketball people in Turkey
Croatian expatriate basketball people in the United States
Croatian men's basketball players
Fenerbahçe men's basketball players
Houston Rockets draft picks
Houston Rockets players
Indiana Pacers players
Joventut Badalona players
KK Split players
Lega Basket Serie A players
Libertas Liburnia Basket Livorno players
Liga ACB head coaches
Liga ACB players
Medalists at the 1992 Summer Olympics
National Basketball Association players from Croatia
Olimpia Milano players
Olympic basketball players of Croatia
Olympic medalists in basketball
Olympic silver medalists for Croatia
Real Madrid Baloncesto players
Toronto Raptors expansion draft picks
Toronto Raptors players
Yugoslav men's basketball players
CB Miraflores coaches